Somova is a commune in Tulcea County, Northern Dobruja, Romania. It is composed of three villages: Mineri (formerly Câșle), Parcheș and Somova.

References

Communes in Tulcea County
Localities in Northern Dobruja
Place names of Slavic origin in Romania